Aslı Kalaç (born December 13, 1995) is a Turkish volleyball player. She plays for Yeşilyurt Women's Volleyball Team. Kalaç debuted in the girls' youth national team in 2011, and is currently a member of the Turkey women's junior national volleyball team. She wears number 9.

She was born on December 13, 1995, in Istanbul. Her father canalized her in 2006 summer to volleyball after she was engaged in swimming sport for one year. In the beginning, she was coached by Münip Özdurak at Yeşilyurt Women's Volleyball Team. After playing for two seasons at the TVF Sport High School, she signed in July 2011 for Yeşilyurt Women's Volleyball, which competes in the Turkish Women's Volleyball League.

Clubs
  Yeşilyurt (2006-2009)
  TVF Sport High School (2009-2011)
  Yeşilyurt (2011-2012)

Awards

National team
 2011 FIVB Girls Youth World Championship - 
 2011 European Youth Summer Olympic Festival - 
 2012 Women's Junior European Volleyball Championship - 
 2021 Nations League

See also
 Turkish women in sports

References

External links
 

1995 births
Volleyball players from Istanbul
Living people
Turkish women's volleyball players
Yeşilyurt volleyballers
Galatasaray S.K. (women's volleyball) players
European Games gold medalists for Turkey
European Games medalists in volleyball
Volleyball players at the 2015 European Games
Turkey women's international volleyball players
Competitors at the 2018 Mediterranean Games
Mediterranean Games bronze medalists for Turkey
Mediterranean Games medalists in volleyball
21st-century Turkish sportswomen